KOFG (91.1 FM) is a radio station broadcasting a religious format. Licensed to Cody, Wyoming, United States, the station is currently owned by James and Marilene Atnip, through licensee Gospel Messengers.

Listen online

http://listen.streamon.fm/kofg

References

External links
 
 
www.kofgfm.com

Cody, Wyoming
OFG